Vigathakumaran is a 1930 Indian silent film written, produced and directed by J. C. Daniel. He also played the role of hero in the movie. A social drama, Vigathakumaran was the first Malayalam feature film and J. C. Daniel is considered as the father of Malayalam cinema industry for this work. This movie is also the first Indian social drama feature film. This film is lost, as no copy of the film has survived.

Plot 
Chandrakumar, son of a rich man in Travancore is kidnapped by the villain Bhoothanathan to Ceylon. The efforts of his parents to find him do not succeed and Chandrakumar is brought up as a labourer in an estate. The estate owner, who is British, takes a liking to him and in time, Chandrakumar rises to the post of Superintendent. At this time Jayachandran, a distant relative of Chandrakumar happens to come to Ceylon. Incidentally, he is robbed of all his belongings by Bhoothanathan. Stranded, he gets acquainted with Chandrakumar and they become close friends. They come to Travancore where Chandrakumar's sister falls in love with Jayachandran. Meanwhile, Bhoothanathan attempts to kidnap her and the duo's timely intervention saves her. A scar on the back reveals Chandrakumar's identity which eventually leads to the happy reunion of the family. After this  the film ends.

Cast 
 J. C. Daniel as Jayachandran
 P. K. Rosy as Sarojam
 Johnson as Bhoothanathan
 Sunder Raj as Chandrakumar

Production 
J.C. Daniel Nadar developed a passion for cinema while completing his higher education in Travancore. He was interested in martial arts and was an expert in chelambatam, the traditional martial art of southern Travancore. He published an English book titled Indian Art of Fencing and Sword Play in 1915, when he was 15. Daniel was well aware of the scope of cinema as a public medium. He wished to popularise chelambatam by harnessing the popular influence of cinema. At that time the common mass of Kerala were not even aware of cinema, hence the idea was quite a challenge. He took the challenge and left to Madras (now Chennai) to learn techniques of film-making and to acquire necessary equipments. Madras was the budding centre of film production in South India and had the only permanent talkies in South India, named Gaiety which was established in 1912. However, he could not get what he wanted from Madras and was even denied permission to enter various studio premises in there. That didn't make him to give up. He travelled to Bombay (now Mumbai), the centre of Hindi cinema production. He asked the studio owners for entry claiming that he is a teacher from Kerala and wanted to teach his students about cinema and got entry to the studios there. He could gather enough knowledge and equipments for film production from Bombay and came back to Kerala to fulfil his dream. The film was finally shot in his own studio.

In 1926, J.C. Daniel established the first film studio in Kerala named The Travancore National Pictures. It was near the present Public Service Commission office, Pattom, Trivandrum. He made money for the purpose by selling a piece of land in his name for 4 lakh British Indian Rupees. With all set, he started production works of the film of his dreams. He wrote the script and titled it Vigathakumaran (literally translated as The Lost Child). He directed and wielded the camera for the film, which was mute. He was also the protagonist in the film. He also did most of the post production work including editing. The theme of the film was of social significance and was the first in that genre. Most of the Indian cinemas at that time were based on stories from the puranas and cinemas with social themes were scarce. The film was shot using a debrie camera.

The first Malayalam actress was a scheduled caste labourer named P. K. Rosy from a place called Thayycaud near Trivandrum. The cinematographer of the film was Lala (a Britisher). She used to come with lunch to act in the movie and go for her work in the evening. Daniel had earlier signed an actress from Bombay named Lana to act in the heroine role. Another important role was played by Johnson, who is the father of actress B. S. Saroja. Daniel's friend Sundar Raj also acted in a pivotal role in the film.

Release 

The release date of the film is unknown. There are 2 dates proposed.
The film was released on 7 November 1928. Vigathakumaran was exhibited in Trivandrum at the Capitol Theatre at 6:30 p.m. on 23 October 1930. The theatre was located opposite the present day AG's office near the present day State Legislature Building in the centre of Thiruvananthapuram city. The screening was inaugurated by Adv. Malloor Govinda Pillai. Since it was a silent movie, there was an announcer at the theatre who would explain the story and the situation. Despite being the first cinema made in Kerala and the social significance of the cinema, it faced the wrath of certain Hindu orthodox groups in Kerala, due to the presence of a woman in the film. At that time acting in films were considered as an act worse than prostitution. It was a period when female roles in even plays were played by males. When Vigathakumaran was released at Capitol Theatre in Thiruvananthapuram, she was not allowed into the theatre as some upper-caste Hindus, outraged that a converted dalit could play a Nair lady in the film, created a ruckus. During the screening, stones were pelt on the screen, damaging it. The movie was also exhibited in Alleppey at the Star Theatre. Alleppey being one of the most important port towns in Kerala during that time, the audience were more tolerant. They received the movie with exhilaration. There was a minor glitch when the screen faded and the audience booed. The announcer explained that since this is the first Malayalam film, there will be some minor problems and the audience received the statement with applause. It is said that J.C.Daniel himself came to Alleppey with the film box, since there was only one print. The film was also screened at Quilon, Thrissur, Tellichery and Nagercoil. The film did only a moderate business at the box office and the collections were way less than the expenditure.

Females acting in films or plays were considered worse than prostitution at that time. Angry at a lower caste lady portraying an upper caste Nair on screen, some of the orthodox people burned down Rosy's hut. She ran away and reached Nagarcoil. Nobody knows the whereabouts of Rosy after she left Trivandrum. It was only recently that her photo was retrieved from Malloor Govinda Pillai's diaries.

After the film not generating enough money at the box office, Daniel suffered from debts and to overcome the situation, he had to sell his equipments and close down his studio. Despite the setbacks, Daniel went on to make one more film, a documentary on martial arts, Adithadi Murai. He was completely bankrupt after the completion of this film. Almost a pauper, he left Trivandrum to seek a livelihood. Daniel spent the rest of his life as a dentist at Palayamkottai, Madurai and Karaikudi.

The Kerala Government initially refused to give Daniel any honour because J.C. Daniel was born and also later settled in Kanyakumari district which later became a part of Tamil Nadu, in 1956. The Government's insistence was that if Daniel wanted any financial assistance, he had to apply for it from the Tamil Nadu Government. At the far end of his life, he had told R. Kumaraswamy, the editor of the film magazine Nana: "Malayalam cinema is a thriving industry now. But never have anyone bothered to recognise me as someone who made a film all by himself in those days. As for the new generation, they don't know me. But it is not their fault, I soothe myself." Long after Daniel's death in 1975, as an afterthought, the Kerala Government instituted the J. C. Daniel Award in 1992, as a part of the Kerala State Film Awards, to honour lifetime achievements in Malayalam cinema. Daniel is now known as the father of Malayalam cinema. The failure of Vigathakumaran is attributed by some people, to it being a silent film, although all cinemas were silent back then. In reality this cinema was a huge success artistically, and failed only from a financial perspective.

Legacy 
A lot of literary and cinema works have been made, based on the life of J. C. Daniel and the making of Vigathakumaran. Nashta Nayika is a novel by Vinu Abraham which details the life of P. K. Rosy, the heroine of Vigathakumaran. The film was remade in 2003.

In 2013, Kamal wrote and directed a biopic on J.C. Daniel titled Celluloid. The film details the struggles of Daniel to produce and exhibit Vigathakumaran, while plunging into financial crisis. The film, based partially on the novel Nashta Naayika by Vinu Abraham and the Life of J. C. Daniel, a biography by film journalist Chelangat Gopalakrishnan, also deals with the life of Rosy, the lead actress in Vigathakumaran. Prithviraj plays the role of Daniel, while Mamta Mohandas plays his wife Janet and newcomer Chandni plays Rosy. The film generated criticism over its subtle reference to an IAS Officer and the then Kerala Chief Minister, which purportedly points to the bureaucrat and writer Malayattoor Ramakrishna Iyer and K. Karunakaran, who allegedly worked together to deny J. C. Daniel credit for his contribution to Malayalam cinema since he was a Nadar (Christian). Author and civil servant N. S. Madhavan and D. Babu Paul, former Chief Secretary of Kerala have pointed out factual inaccuracies in the film's depiction of Malayattoor and Karunakaran.

References

External links 
 

Lost Indian films
Indian silent films
1930 directorial debut films
Indian black-and-white films
1930 drama films
1930 films
Indian drama films
Films shot in Thiruvananthapuram
Films shot in Kollam
Films shot in Alappuzha
1930 lost films
Silent drama films